Richard Hills may refer to:

 Richard Hills (cricketer) (born 1951), former English cricketer
 Richard Hills (jockey) (born 1963), retired flat racing jockey
 Richard Hills (politician) (born 1985/86), New Zealand politician on Auckland Council
 Richard L. Hills (1936–2019), English historian
 Richard Edwin Hills (1945–2022), British astronomer and professor of radio astronomy
 Dick Hills (1926–1996), British comedy writer, see Dick Hills and Sid Green

See also
 Richard Hill (disambiguation)